Ivan Ivanovich, or Ioann Ioannovich, also known as Ivan the Young (15 February 1458 – 6 March 1490), was the eldest son and heir of Ivan III of Russia from his first marriage to Maria of Tver.

Biography
Ivan's father empowered him to deal with most administrative and military affairs of the state in order to make ordinary Russian people think of him as their future ruler. He bestowed upon Ivan the title of grand prince, so the Muscovite ambassadors and government officials used to speak on behalf of the two grand princes. Ambassadors from different Russian cities (e.g. Novgorod), as well ambassadors from foreign countries, could equally address both Ivan III and Ivan the Young with the same requests or problems.

Russian chronicles mention Ivan's participation in military campaigns against Ibrahim of Kazan in 1468 and Novgorod in 1471. In 1476 and 1478, Ivan III put Ivan in charge of Moscow during his absence from the Russian capital. 

In 1480, when Akhmat Khan moved towards the Russian borders, the grand prince sent Ivan Molodoy with numerous regiments to the Ugra River. The Great standing on the Ugra river started. Ivan III moved towards the Oka River, but soon returned to Moscow and demanded his son's return, fearing for his life. Ivan the Young refused to obey his father, however, who then ordered his assistant, Prince Kholmsky, to bring him back to the capital. Ivan insisted on staying on the shores of the Ugra. When the river froze up, Ivan Molodoy moved north at the request of his father and went to Borovsk, where the grand prince held a defensive position. Akhmat Khan, however, chose to withdraw and the Russian army returned to Moscow.

In 1485, Ivan was rewarded with his mother's inheritance in Tver and was installed as the ruler of that city, recently conquered by his father. Soon afterward, he fell ill with gout. His doctor, named Leon, bragged to Ivan III that he could cure him and began treatment with the grand prince's permission. Ivan Molodoy's health continued to deteriorate until he finally died on 6 March 1490. Leon was later executed.

Ivan Molodoy left a son named Dmitry Ivanovich from his marriage to Elena, daughter of the great Stephen III of Moldavia.

See also
Rulers of Russia family tree

References

Rurik dynasty
People of the Grand Duchy of Moscow
1458 births
1490 deaths
Heirs apparent who never acceded